Don Mottley was a member of the Ohio House of Representatives from 1993 to 2000.  His district consisted of a portion of Montgomery County, Ohio.  He was succeeded by Jon Husted.

External links
http://www.daytondailynews.com/o/content/shared-gen/blogs/dayton/ohiopolitics/entries/2007/10/25/don_mottley_packs_his_bags.html

Republican Party members of the Ohio House of Representatives
Living people
Year of birth missing (living people)